The 1984 Polish Speedway season was the 1984 season of motorcycle speedway in Poland.

Individual

Polish Individual Speedway Championship
The 1984 Individual Speedway Polish Championship final was held on 16 September at Gorzów.

Golden Helmet
The 1984 Golden Golden Helmet organised by the Polish Motor Union (PZM) was the 1984 event for the league's leading riders. The final was held on 7 July at Wrocław.

Junior Championship
 winner - Wojciech Załuski

Silver Helmet
 winner - Ryszard Dołomisiewicz

Bronze Helmet
 winner - Ryszard Dołomisiewicz

Pairs

Polish Pairs Speedway Championship
The 1984 Polish Pairs Speedway Championship was the 1984 edition of the Polish Pairs Speedway Championship. The final was held on 21 June at Chorzów.

Team

Team Speedway Polish Championship
The 1984 Team Speedway Polish Championship was the 1984 edition of the Team Polish Championship.

Unia Leszno won the league but were stripped of the gold medal. Leading Stal Rzeszów 41-25 after eleven races, they allowed Stal to win the final four heats 5-1 for a 45-45 draw. This guaranteed that Stal would not have to take part in a relegation/promotion play off. GKSŻ considered the behavior of Leszno as unsportsmanlike and awadred the match 41-25. Leszno were stripped of the title and Stal took part in the play off which they won. The team included Roman Jankowski, Zenon Kasprzak and Mariusz Okoniewski.

First League

Second League

References

Poland Individual
Poland Team
Speedway
1984 in Polish speedway